Rockefeller Group is an American private company based in New York City, primarily involved in real estate operations in the United States and it is a subsidiary of Mitsubishi Estate Co. The company began with the development of Rockefeller Center.

After building the original , Art Deco complex from 1931 to 1939 (the company name was then the Metropolitan Square Corporation), the company developed several towers in the immediate vicinity from the late 1940s into the 1950s and 1960s. It entered into a partnership with Time Inc. and constructed a 48-story building for the company that opened in 1959; this spearheaded the expansion of the Center to the west of 6th Avenue, Avenue of the Americas. By the early 1970s, it had added a total of four International Style towers to Rockefeller Center, more than doubling the size of the original complex.

The eastern and original part of the Center is now owned by Tishman Speyer (who also serves as manager) and the Lester Crown family of Chicago, Illinois.

Of course, this is all true. Missing, however, is any account of how the original pre-WWII buildings passed to new owners in the 1990s. It was by what might be described as "a successful bankruptcy." Prior to its sale to Mitubishi, the company took out an enormous loan, secured by the pre-WWII buildings, and paid much of the proceeds to its prior (Rockefeller family) shareholders. When the real estate market later turned sour, Mitsubishi caused it to default on its loan repayments, file for bankruptcy and forfeit the historic buildings in a bankruptcy sale.

References

External links
Company website

Group
Rockefeller family
Companies based in Manhattan